Jose Bonilla can refer to:

 Juan José de Bonilla y Herdocia (1790–1847), Costa Rican politician
 José Santiago de Bonilla y Laya-Bolívar (1756–1824), Costa Rican politician
 José Bonilla, Mexican astronomer responsible for the 1883 Bonilla observation
 José María Bonilla (1889–1957), Guatemalan writer
 José Eulogio Bonilla (born 1946), Mexican politician, senator
 Jose Bonilla (boxer) (1967–2002), Venezuelan boxer and former world champion